Kisaeng (Hangul: 기생, Hanja: 妓生, RR: Gisaeng), also called ginyeo (Hangul: 기녀, Hanja: 妓女), were women from outcast or slave families who were trained to be courtesans, providing artistic entertainment and conversation to men of upper class. First appearing in Goryeo,  were the government's legal entertainers, required to perform various functions for the state. Many were employed at court, but they were also spread throughout the country. They were carefully trained and frequently accomplished in the fine arts, poetry, and prose, and although they were of low social class, they were respected as educated artists. Aside from entertainment, their roles included medical care and needlework.

 play an important role in Korean conceptions of the traditional culture of the Joseon. Although the names of most real  have been forgotten, a few are remembered for an outstanding attribute, such as skill or loyalty. The most famous of these is the 16th century Hwang Jini.

Social position
They shared this status with other entertainers, as well as butchers and slaves. The same practice was followed for conscripted slaves.  could only be released from their position if a hefty price was paid to the government; this could only be done by a wealthy patron, typically a high government official.

Many  were skilled in poetry, and numerous  composed by  have survived. These often reflect themes of heartache and parting, similar to poems composed by scholars in exile. In addition, some of the most famous  poems were composed to persuade prominent scholars to spend the night. The  style later came to be associated with  women, while women of  status focused on the  form.

They were separately entered on the census rolls. The  were regarded as of significantly higher status than the slaves, although technically they were all of  rank.

Though they were of low social class, the  held a unique role in ancient Korea's society, and were respected for their career as educated artists and writers. For this reason, they were sometimes spoken of as "possessing the body of the lower class but the mind of the aristocrat" and as having a "paradoxical identity as a socially despised yet popularly (unofficially) acclaimed artist". Not all  engaged in prostitution as different groups or tiers of  had different educations and roles. Numerous accounts report individual  as specializing specifically in arts, music, poetry, and conversation skills.

Career

The career of most  was very short, generally peaking at age 16 or 17, and over by age 22. Only a few  were able to maintain their business for very long beyond this time. It may be for this reason that the  training institutes accepted entrants as young as eight. All  were obliged by law to retire at age 50. The best prospect most  had for long-term support was through becoming the concubine of a patron. However, even this was not an option unless their patron first purchased them from the state, which few men of the Joseon period could afford. Thus, most former  went on to work in or manage a local tavern.

In the later period of Joseon, a three-tiered system developed. The highest tier was occupied by  who sang and danced at upper-class feasts.  were not permitted to entertain after they turned 30. However, they could continue working in other duties, such as dressmaking and medicine, until the age of 50. They received guests only by choice. The  (Korean: 행수; Hanja: 行首) of each district, who was the leader of the kisaeng, took charge of discipline and training new .

 of the lowest tier were called . The three-tiered system, like other aspects of Joseon class division, broke down in the late 19th century.

However, these were the exception.  were required to meet their expenses, including food, clothes, and makeup, out of their own personal funds.

Becoming a 

Women entered the  class through various paths. Others were sold into the wealthy by families who could not afford to support them. Most such families were of  rank, but sometimes poor families of higher status sold their children in this fashion. On occasion, even women from the  aristocracy were made , usually because they had violated the strict sexual mores of the Joseon period.

As  were skilled workers from the beginning, the government took an early interest in ensuring correct education. During the Joseon period, this became further codified, with instruction focusing on music and dance.

The course of study lasted three years and covered poetry, dance, music, and art. The most advanced such school was located in Pyongyang.

Daily life
As slaves of the government, the lives of kisaeng were closely regulated. They were overseen by the officer in charge of kisaeng, known as the hojang. The hojang was also in charge of maintaining the kisaeng register, and ensuring that none of the district's kisaeng had fled. Kisaeng were required to answer the requests of patrons, unless they had previously notified the hojang. The kisaeng of the district were expected to appear for inspection twice a month and also when a new official arrived in the area. In addition, they were required to report for continuing education, usually focused on music and dance. The frequency and content of this training varied from region to region.

However, the detailed affairs of the kisaeng were not directly overseen by the state. Order was kept within each gyobang, which might include some tens of kisaeng, by the haengsu kisaeng, those of the highest tier. When problems arose between a kisaeng and a client, or when charges of criminal conduct were made against a kisaeng, the haengsu kisaeng usually took the leading role in resolving the situation.

In addition, most kisaeng had a gibu, or "kisaeng husband", who provided protection and economic support, such as buying them valuable things or granting them social status in return for entertainment. Most gibu were former soldiers, government enforcers, or servants of the royal household. At times, there was friction between would-be customers and possessive gibu, although the gibu was not the kisaeng's husband and had no legal claim to her. The role of the gibu changed over time; at first, many kisaeng in government service had no such patron. However, by the late Joseon dynasty, the gibu system was more or less universal.

In the Joseon Dynasty, kisaeng houses were typically located near the center of a town, often close to the marketplace. They were laid out to create a welcoming effect; in many cases, a location was chosen with a fine view, and the area around the house would be landscaped with ornamental pools and plantings.

Politics and diplomacy
Kisaeng played a number of important political roles, as servants of the state and in their own right. They were employed to entertain visiting foreign dignitaries from parts of China, and to accompany them if they travelled through the country.

Thanks to their frequenting the taverns and guest-houses of the town, kisaeng were often among the most knowledgeable on local affairs. For this reason, they were at times a key source of intelligence. It was through information supplied by kisaeng that the rebel army of Hong Gyeong-nae was able to easily take the fortress of Jongju in the early 19th century.

When cities fell, as many of Korea's cities did during the Japanese invasions of Korea (1592–98) in the late 16th century, kisaeng were often made to entertain the generals of the victorious army. Some of Korea's most famous kisaeng, including Nongae of Jinju, are remembered today for their bravery in killing or attempting to kill leaders of the imperial Japanese army.

Some kisaeng were also active in the Korean independence movements of the early 20th century. In this they resembled other women of Joseon, who often took a leading role in the independence struggle. Aengmu, a kisaeng of Daegu, was a major donor to the National Debt Repayment Movement in the early 20th century. Some fifty kisaeng of Jinju took part in a demonstration as part of the March 1st Movement in 1919.

Regional differences

Kisaeng seem to have been relatively few in number, at the most a few thousand. They were spread throughout the country, with a few hundred in the larger centers and smaller numbers in the hyeon villages. They were also found in the "stations" and inns which provided food and shelter to travelers along the country's arterial roads, such as the Great Yeongnam Road.

The number and characteristics of the kisaeng varied greatly from region to region. During the Joseon period, the city with the most kisaeng by far was Seoul, then called Hanseong, with perhaps 1000. Many of these worked for the court, and helped to fill the vast number of trained entertainers needed for grand festivals. Beautiful or talented kisaeng were often taken from the provinces to Seoul. The required training for kisaeng in Seoul was regular and very strict, with inattentive kisaeng sent home.

There were also large numbers of kisaeng in the old capitals of Gaesong and Pyeongyang. The kisaeng of Pyeongyang were noted for their high level of skill and beauty. The kisaeng school of Pyeongyang was one of the country's most advanced, and continued operating until late in the colonial period. The kisaeng of Pyeongyang were also known for their ability to recite the gwan san yung ma, a song by the 18th-century composer Shin Gwangsu.

Other large concentrations existed around military camps, particularly along the northern border. For instance, in the time of Sejong the Great in the 15th century, there were some sixty kisaeng attached to the army base at Yongbyon. In these areas, kisaeng essentially filled the role of wives for the army and their role was commensurately more focused on domestic tasks than entertainment.

The kisaeng of other regions also maintained distinctive local identities. The kisaeng of Jinju were particularly adept at the Geommu, a traditional sword dance. Those of Jeju were known for their equestrian prowess. In many cases, the noted skills of a region's kisaeng corresponded with some other local claim to fame. The kisaeng of the Gwandong region on the east coast, home to many famous sights including Mount Kumgang, memorized the gwan dong byeol gok, a poem recounting their region's scenery. Those of the Honam region in the southwest were trained in pansori, while those of the seonbi city Andong could recite the Great Learning (Daxue; Daehak) by heart.

History

An overwhelming silence hangs over the official histories of Korea when it comes to the kisaeng. They enter only occasionally into official records such as the Goryeosa or Veritable Records of the Joseon Dynasty. For example, the Royal Protocols, or Ǔigwe, records names of those who worked to prepare for important court rituals, and some kisaeng are listed as needleworkers. Yet references to kisaeng are quite widespread in the yadam or "anecdotal histories" of later Joseon and Silhak thinkers such as Yi Ik and Jeong Yakyong, known as Dasan, who gave some thought to their role and station in society. A few records of kisaeng that exist are used in the study of their history, such as Joseon Haeeohwhasa, Nogpajapgi, and Joseon miinbogam, the last one being written in the Japanese colonial period. Even today, many formal histories of Korea pay little or no heed to the story of the kisaeng. For example, Lee Ki-baik's New History of Korea does not contain a single reference to the kisaeng.

Origins
There are various theories concerning the origin of the kisaeng. The first such theory was formulated by the scholar Dasan, and theories have multiplied as the kisaeng themselves have receded further into the past.

One theory actually places their origins in the Silla, among the wonhwa, female predecessors of the hwarang. However, there is little to suggest a concrete link between Silla's wonhwa and the later kisaeng. Also, the wonhwa seem to have been chosen from among the aristocracy, whereas kisaeng were always members of the lower classes. For these reasons, few contemporary scholars support this theory.

Many others trace their origins to the early years of Goryeo, when many people were displaced following the end of the Later Three Kingdoms period in 936. At this time, a large number of Baekje people wandered the country. It is not clear whether this nomadic lifestyle was already established, or a consequence of the recent turmoil. In fact, a connection between these wanderers and the nomadic tribes of Manchuria has been conjectured. The first king of Goryeo, Taejo, considered these wanderers to be a threat to the stability of the state. He ordered that they be made into slaves of the government. Although no certain records exist, it is likely that the first kisaeng were drawn from these former wanderers.

Goryeo
Regardless of their origins, kisaeng first emerged as a class and rose to prominence during the Goryeo Dynasty, 935–1394. They are first mentioned in the early 11th century. At this time, they were primarily engaged in skilled trades such as needlework, music, and medicine. The female entertainers of the court during this period filled a role similar to that later filled by almost all kisaeng.

Due to the growth of the kisaeng class, during the reign of Myeongjong the state began to keep records (called gijeok) of the kisaeng living in each jurisdiction. Around this time, the state also made its first efforts to set up educational institutions to train kisaeng entertainers. These academies were known as gyobang, and first appear in history with their abolition by King Hyeonjong in 1010. However, they were re-established in the reign of Chungnyeol. The gyobang provided training in the dangak and sogak musical styles.

The women trained in the gyobang were exclusively court entertainers. Their role in the affairs of the court became increasingly important as the dynasty progressed. They entertained both the king and visiting dignitaries, a role which continued into the Joseon period. In addition, beginning in the reign of Munjong, they performed at official ceremonies of the state.

Just as the origin of the kisaeng is unclear, so is their precise relation to other strata of society. The female entertainers who appear in records are exclusively kisaeng of the court, and are recorded as slaves of the government.

Joseon dynasty

Goryeo was succeeded by the Joseon dynasty, which lasted from 1394 to 1897. During the Joseon dynasty, the kisaeng system continued to flourish and develop, despite the government's deeply ambivalent attitude toward it.

Joseon was founded on Korean Confucianism, and these scholars of the time took a very dim view of professional women and of the kisaeng class in particular. There were many calls for the abolition of the kisaeng, or for their exclusion from court, but these were not successful—perhaps because of the influence of the women themselves, or perhaps because of fear that officials would take to stealing the wives of other men. One such proposal was made during the reign of Sejong the Great, but when an advisor of the court suggested that the abolition of the class would lead to government officials committing grave crimes, the king chose to preserve the kisaeng.

During the brief and violent reign of Yeonsangun, 1494–1506, kisaeng became symbolic of royal excess. Yeonsan-gun treated women as primarily objects of pleasure, and made even the medicinal kisaeng (yakbang gisaeng) into entertainers. Yeonsan-gun brought 1,000 women and girls from the provinces to serve as palace kisaeng; many of them were paid from the public treasury. He may have been the first to institute a formal hierarchy among them, dividing the kisaeng of the palace into "Heaven", those with whom he slept, and "Earth", those who served other functions.

In 1650, all kisaeng were made slaves of the government. The kisaeng attached to a government office were known as gwan-gi, or "kisaeng of the office". Their role did not, by law, include sexual service to the officeholder; in fact, government officials could be punished severely for consorting with a kisaeng. However, in practice kisaeng were often forced to serve the officeholder. A distinction was sometimes made between those gwan-gi who were obliged to sleep with the officeholder, and those who were not. This distinction was featured in the popular play Chunhyangga.

The Gabo Reform of 1895 officially abolished the class system of Joseon dynasty, and slavery as well. From that year forward, all kisaeng became nominally free, and the gwan-gi no longer belonged to the government. In practice, many kisaeng, like many other slaves, continued in servitude for many years. In addition, many of those who were freed had no alternative career; they continued as entertainers, now without the protections afforded by kisaeng status. During the subsequent decade, many of these kisaeng went to elsewhere to work.

Japanese colonial period 
In 1908, the Japanese police enacted the Kisaeng Tansongnyŏng, which required all kisaeng to register under a 'guild' called chohap with a permit from the police to continue their occupation. Later, these guilds were changed to gwonbeon, which not only was a group of kisaeng under registration but was also a school to teach young kisaeng mainly traditional art, such as calligraphy, dance, and songs. During the colonial period, the preexisting tiers or structures of kisaeng disappeared, and they were more viewed as relevant to prostitution than before. Most of the kisaeng of this time performed in restaurants or entertainment houses to earn a living, and they were often seen as a tourist attraction for the Japanese in Korea, especially Seoul.

Modern Kisaeng
The 1970s onward saw kisaeng dances and vocabulary partially preserved in the contemporary Korean dance and theatre scene observed in the gwonbeon, kisaeng schools, that predominated during the Japanese colonial period, between 1910 and 1945. Although true gwŏnbŏn no longer existed, an academic convention developed where students would study privately with former kisaeng or gwŏnbŏn entertainers.

Very few traditional kisaeng houses continue to operate in South Korea, and many traditions and dances are considered to be lost forever. Some South Korean businesses continue to escort visiting foreign business people to a kisaeng house, but these locations are mostly modern interpretations of old kisaeng houses. The oldest traditional kisaeng house in Korea, Ohjinam (오진암), was closed in 2010. Today, the kisaeng's evolution and impact on Korean society is receiving new attention as Koreans increase efforts to rediscover and revitalize their cultural and historical heritage. However, this interest is focused almost entirely on the historical kisaeng of the Joseon period, and not on the traces of the kisaeng which endure today.

In North Korea, all kisaeng descendants were labelled as members of the 'hostile class' and are considered to have 'bad songbun', i.e. "tainted blood".

Literary and artistic depictions

Kisaeng have played important roles in Korean popular literature since the mid-Joseon Dynasty. As popular literature such as novels and pansori emerged, kisaeng often took a leading role. This was in part due to their unique role as women who could move freely in society. Kisaeng appear as heroines in stories such as Chunhyangga, and as important figures in many other Joseon-era narratives.

Kisaeng also began to appear in the vernacular art of later Joseon. They are particularly common in the work of the famed early 19th-century painter Hyewon, whose work focused on both the life of the cheonmin, including kisaeng, and erotic themes. During the colonial period, kisaeng were a popular object to Japanese and Korean painters, and postcards with the picture of Korean kisaeng were circulated in Japan.

Kisaeng continue to be central to the understanding and imagining of Joseon culture in contemporary South and North Korea. For example, the female lead in the film Chi-hwa-seon was a kisaeng, the companion of painter Owon. Fresh treatments of popular kisaeng stories, including the fictional Chunhyang and the historical Hwang Jin-Yi, continue to emerge in popular novels and cinema. There was a modern re-telling of Kisaengin the Kdrama Tales of a Kisaeng.

Literary and artistic works by kisaeng 
Not very many works by kisaeng are extant this day. While many were accomplished artists in their time, it is likely that their work was not deemed valuable enough to keep or store. A large amount of their poetry survive, Hwang Jin-I being one of the most famous kisaeng poets (Book: Songs of the Kisaeng: courtesan poetry of the last Korean dynasty). While very little of their painting survive, the National Museum of Korea has thirteen of Juk-hyang's paintings of plants and flowers. In the Japanese colonial period, though the education of gwonbeon still focused on traditional music and performance, the scope of their art expanded along with the cultural changes of society to include both folk genres and Japanese music. The transmission of many songs and dances, albeit some with modification, were through the kisaeng of this period.

Famous kisaeng
Notable kisaeng include:
 Du-hyang, lover of Toegye Yi Hwang, committed suicide in a river in her hometown Danyang after Toegye's death. Her tomb still stands near where she committed suicide.
 Sangchunrim, kisaeng of Seoul during Jungjong, associated with many scholars: Sin Jong-ho, Jeong Sa-yong, Hong Eon-pil, Kim Han-guk, & Jeong Sun-yeong.
 Gang-a, kisaeng of Jeolla during Seonjo, Jeong Cheol's lover.
 Juk-hyang, kisaeng during Sunjo, painter and Kim Jeong-hui's lover.
 Chu-hyang, Sim Yook's lover, best female poet during her time.
 Yi Mae-chang, poet of Buan
 Hong Rang
 Seol-mae, noted wit.
 Hwang Jin-i, musician and intellectual of Gaeseong.
 Non Gae, remembered for killing a Japanese general during the battle of Jinju.
 Gyewolhyang, who attempted to have the Japanese general Konishi Yukinaga killed in Pyeongyang.
 Man-hyang of Hamheung
 Yuji of Hwangju
 Kim Ja-ya, the last classically trained kisaeng in South Korea.
 Lee Hwajungseon, a kisaeng who gave an interview, that was unprecedented at that time, on the March 1923 issue of Contemporary Review.
 Wang Su-bok, the most popular singer in Korea in 1935.

See also
 Ca trù, a similar profession in Vietnam
 Caste in the sex industry
 Geisha or Oiran, a similar profession in Japan
 Kanhopatra
 Kippumjo
 Tawaif, a similar profession during colonial India

Notes

Works cited
   (In two volumes).
 
 
 
 Kim, Dong-uk.  (1963).  Women's literary achievements (Yi Dynasty).  Korea Journal 3(11), 33–36.  (Link: search author's name in the box in the middle of the page; do not change language or search in the top of the page, which will lead to an external site)
 
 
 McCann, David.  (1974).  Traditional world of kisaeng.  Korea Journal 14(2), 40–43. (Link: search author's name in the box in the middle of the page; do not change language or search in the top of the page, which will lead to an external site)

Further reading

  (Tr. from Japanese original)
 

 
Joseon dynasty
Comfort women
Slavery in Korea